Kurinji College of Engineering and Technology is a College of Engineering that is located in Kurungi Nagar, Manapparai, Tiruchirappalli.

Affiliations
This college is currently affiliated with Anna University Chennai.

External links

Engineering colleges in Tamil Nadu
Colleges affiliated to Anna University
Education in Tiruchirappalli district